Sandrine Levet (born July 22, 1982) is a French professional rock climber, specializing in bouldering and lead climbing, and is one of the most successful female competition climbers in history. Levet dominated competition bouldering in the early to mid-2000s, winning five IFSC Bouldering World Cups, and one IFSC Bouldering World Championship. Levet was also a strong lead climber, finishing second three times in the IFSC Lead Climbing World Cup, which also helped her to win the overall IFSC Combined Climbing World Cup five times.  As of the end of 2022, Levet had won the second-most IFSC gold medals of any female competitive climber in history.

Biographic notes 
Daughter of mountaineers, she started climbing when she was five years old. In the following ten years, she also practiced cross-country skiing, ski mountaineering, gymnastics and swimming.

Rankings

Climbing World Cup

Climbing World Championships

Number of medals in the Climbing World Cup

Lead

Bouldering

See also
List of grade milestones in rock climbing
History of rock climbing
Rankings of most career IFSC gold medals

References

External links 

 
 

1982 births
Living people
French rock climbers
IFSC Climbing World Championships medalists
IFSC Climbing World Cup overall medalists
Boulder climbers